Montemor-o-Novo is a municipality in the District of Évora in Portugal. The population in 2011 was 17,437, in an area of 1232.97 km2. The city itself had a population of 8,928 in 2001.

The present Mayor is Olímpio Manuel Vidigal Galvão, elected in 2021 by the Socialist Party. The municipal holiday is March 8, after Saint John of God, a 16th-century saint, who was born in Montemor-o-Novo.

Parishes

Administratively, the municipality is divided into 7 civil parishes (freguesias):
 Cabrela
 Ciborro
 Cortiçadas de Lavre e Lavre
 Foros de Vale de Figueira
 Nossa Senhora da Vila, Nossa Senhora do Bispo e Silveiras
 Santiago do Escoural
 São Cristóvão

Gallery

Notable people

 Vasco Gil Sodré (c.1450 — c.1500) a Portuguese navigator, early settler of the Azores island of Graciosa
 Saint John of God (1495–1550) a canonized Portuguese soldier turned health-care worker in Spain, whose followers later formed the Brothers Hospitallers of Saint John of God.
 Fernando Martins Mascarenhas (c.1548 – 1628) a scholar, theologian, and church leader
 Maria Clara Correia Alves (1869–1948) a Portuguese feminist, co-founder of the National Council of Portuguese Women
 Kalidás Barreto (1932–2020), trade unionist.
 Luís Capoulas Santos (born 1951) a Portuguese politician and Govt. Minister
 Ai Weiwei (born 1957), Chinese contemporary artist and activist

References

External links
Town Hall official website
Photos from Montemor-o-Novo

Municipalities of Évora District